Archboldiodendron is a genus of flowering plant belonging to the family Theaceae.

Its native range is New Guinea.

Species:

Archboldiodendron calosericeum

References

Theaceae
Ericales genera